Rafael Nadal defeated Roger Federer in the final, 7–5, 3–6, 7–6(7–3), 3–6, 6–2 to win the men's singles tennis title at the 2009 Australian Open. It was his first Australian Open title and his sixth major title overall. Nadal became the first Spaniard to win the title.

Novak Djokovic was the defending champion, but retired due to heat stress in the quarterfinals against Andy Roddick.

The 2009 men's singles edition is considered to be one of the best Grand Slam tournaments in the Open Era. It is remembered for containing many of the best matches of the 2009 season, including the Nadal–Fernando Verdasco semifinal (lasting 5 hours and 14 minutes) and the final.  It was also the first hard court major in which Nadal reached the final.

Seeds

Qualifying

Draw

Finals

Top half

Section 1

Section 2

Section 3

Section 4

Bottom half

Section 5

Section 6

Section 7

Section 8

References

External links
 Association of Tennis Professionals (ATP) – 2009 Australian Open Men's Singles draw
 2009 Australian Open – Men's draws and results at the International Tennis Federation

Men's Singles
Australian Open (tennis) by year – Men's singles